Jabir Al-Azmi is a former Kuwaiti politician, representing the fifth district. Born in 1970, Al-Azmi studied Sharia law and worked in at the Kuwait Ministry of Awqaf and Islamic Affairs before being elected to the National Assembly in 2006.

Opposed Guaranteeing Bank Deposits
On October 28, 2008, the parliament voted 50–7 to insure all types of deposits in all local banks within Kuwait.  Al-Azmi opposed the bill, along with Hussein Al-Qallaf Al-Bahraini, Daifallah Bouramiya, Mohammed Al-Obaid, Mohammed Hayef Al-Mutairi, Musallam Al-Barrak and Waleed Al-Tabtabaie. Al-Azmi accused the Cabinet of speeding up the bill's passage for the benefit of monetary tycoons.

References

1970 births
Living people
Kuwaiti people of Arab descent
Members of the National Assembly (Kuwait)